Lasionycta taigata is a moth of the family Noctuidae. It occurs in open peatlands and fens in the taiga zone from Labrador, Churchill, Manitoba, and central Yukon, southward to northern Maine, northern Minnesota, and south-western Alberta.

Adults are on wing from late June through July.

External links
A Revision of Lasionycta Aurivillius (Lepidoptera, Noctuidae) for North America and notes on Eurasian species, with descriptions of 17 new species, 6 new subspecies, a new genus, and two new species of Tricholita Grote
Images

Lasionycta
Moths of North America
Moths described in 1988